Spot Money SA (Pty) Ltd. is a South African mobile banking platform.

The company launched as Virgin Money South Africa in 2006, as a partnership between Virgin Group (owners of the Virgin Money brand) and Absa, as an issuer of credit cards. The 50-50 joint venture was worth R240 million at the time of launch. By 2013 Virgin Money's customers had R1 billion in total credit. Virgin Money SA launched their Spot app cashless platform in February 2018. As of July 2019 the Spot app had 400,000 users.

Following the discontinuation of the Virgin Money South Africa credit card, the company and app was acquired by its management and a local private equity company, and renamed Spot Money. The 118,000 former credit card customers, with R750 million in total credit, were transferred to Absa's own credit card offering.

The Spot app is operated in association with Bidvest Bank.

References

External links 
 

Banks of South Africa
South African companies established in 2006
Virgin Money